The Women's individual normal hill competition at the FIS Nordic World Ski Championships 2023 was held on 22 and 23 February 2023.

Results

Qualification
The qualification was held on 22 February at 16:30.

Final
The first round was started on 23 February at 17:00 and the final round at 17:58.

References

Women's individual normal hill